is a women's volleyball team based in Kahoku city, Ishikawa, Japan. It plays in the V.League Division 1 having been promoted for the first time for the 2018–2019 season. The club was founded in 1980.
The owner of the team is PFU Limited.

History
 Founded in 1980.
 Promoted to V.Challenge League in 2002.
 Won the V.Challenge League in 2009.
 Promoted to V.Premier League in 2016.

Honors

Team

League results

Current roster
2021–2022 Squad for V.League Division 1 Women

 Head coach:  Masayasu Sakamoto

Imports

Team Staffs
2019 October 1 Edition

Former players

Local players

Yuki Sasaki
Chizuru Kotō (2001–2009)
Haruka Sunada (2009–2014)
Maiko Kano (2015–2018)
Amiyu Ikeda
Yuna Miyajima
Mami Matsunaga
Risa Ohkubo
Mana Tokinaga
Kayoko Tsukahara
Kotomi Matsushita
Miku Suzuki
Seina Kato
Azusa Shimizu
Megumi Funasaki
Chika Mochida
Mao Kawakami
Eri Iyonaga
Maiko Sakashita
Yoshiko Kano
Sayaka Ohbo
Chiaki Takahashi
Rino Makita
Rina Sho (2017–2019)
Aimi Akiyami (2016–2019)
Saori Uda (2015–2020)
Mai Shimizu (2014–2020)
Minori Wada (2018–2020)
Sayaka Tsutsui (2019–2020)
Yukiko Ebata (2015–2021)
Nao Tsuga (2017–2021)
Naoko Shimahata (2016–2021)

Foreign Player

 Yurrany Romana

 Chatchu-on Moksri
 Thanacha Sooksod

 Jennifer Doris (2013–2020)

 Roslandy Acosta (2020–2021)

References

External links
Official website

Japanese volleyball teams
Sports teams in Ishikawa Prefecture